The Hungary women's national football team represents Hungary in international women's football. The team, controlled by the Hungarian Football Federation.

Results and fixtures

 The following is a list of match results in the last 12 months, as well as any future matches that have been scheduled.

2022

2023

Official Hungary results and fixtures

Coaching staff

Current coaching staff

Manager history

 Edina Markó (2014–2020)
 Margret Kratz (2021–)

Players

 Source: Official Hungary squad

Current squad
 Caps and goals accurate up to and including 6 April 2021.

Recent call ups
 The following players have been called up to a Hungary squad in the past 12 months.

Records

Statistics as of 7 May 2014.

Most capped players

Top goalscorers

Competitive record

FIFA Women's World Cup

*Draws include knockout matches decided on penalty kicks.

Olympic Games

UEFA Women's Championship

*Draws include knockout matches decided on penalty kicks.

See also

Sport in Hungary
Football in Hungary
Women's football in Hungary
Hungary women's national football team
Hungary women's national football team results
List of Hungary women's international footballers
Hungary women's national under-20 football team
Hungary women's national under-17 football team
Hungary men's national football team

References

External links
Hungary women's national football team – official website at MLSZ 
FIFA profile at FIFA 

 
national
European women's national association football teams